Hendrick Moyo (born 9 May 1989) is a Botswana football striker who currently plays for Police XI.

References

1989 births
Living people
Botswana footballers
Extension Gunners FC players
Gilport Lions F.C. players
Orapa United F.C. players
Gaborone United S.C. players
Botswana Police XI SC players
Botswana international footballers
Association football forwards
People from Central District (Botswana)